Henry the Peaceful (1411 – 7 December 1473), Duke of Brunswick-Lüneburg, called the Peaceful, ruled over both parts of Brunswick-Lüneburg.

Life 
Henry was the son of Henry the Mild, Duke of Brunswick-Lüneburg. On their father's death in 1416, Henry and his brother William inherited the Principality of Lüneburg, while under the guardianship of the City Council of Lüneburg (Lunenburg). When the Duchy of Brunswick-Lüneburg was reorganized in 1428, Henry and his brother swapped Lüneburg for the Principality of Brunswick, including Calenberg.

After Henry became of age, he tried to separate his and his brother's government. In 1432, he occupied Wolfenbüttel castle, and the brothers agreed to divide the territory: Henry received Brunswick and William received Calenberg, Everstein, and Homburg.

Henry died without sons in 1473; his territory was inherited by his brother William.

Family
Henry married Helen (1423–1471), daughter of Adolph I, Duke of Cleves, in 1436. They only had one child:
 Margaret, Countess of Henneberg (1450–1509), married William III, Count of Henneberg

Ancestors

References

 Braunschweigisches Biographisches Lexikon, Appelhans 2006, 
 Allgemeine Deutsche Biographie, vol. 11, pp. 489–491

1411 births
1473 deaths
Princes of Lüneburg
Princes of Wolfenbüttel
Medieval child monarchs
Middle House of Brunswick
Burials at Brunswick Cathedral